Ambon Island is part of the Maluku Islands of Indonesia. Ambon Island consists of two territories: the city of Ambon to the south and various districts (kecamatan) of the Central Maluku Regency to the north. The main city and seaport is Ambon (with a 2020 Census population of 347,288), which is also the capital of Maluku province, while those districts of Maluku Tengah Regency situated on Ambon Island had a 2020 Census population of 128,069. Ambon has an airport and is home to the Pattimura University and Open University (Universitas Terbuka), state universities, and a few private universities, which include Darussalam University (Universitas Darussalam, UNDAR) and Universitas Kristen Indonesia Maluku (UKIM).

Geography
Ambon Island lies off the southwest coast of the much larger Seram island. It is on the north side of the Banda Sea, part of a chain of volcanic islands that encircle the sea. The southeastern and smaller portion, a peninsula (called Leitimur) is united to the northern (called Leihitu or Hitoe) by a narrow neck of land. The Ambon Bay thus formed cuts about  into the island with the airport on the northern shore and the city of Ambon on the southern side. The city of Ambon covers the entirety of Leitimur, with its centre on the northwest coast of Leitimur, facing Leihitu, and has a safe harbor on Amboina Bay.

They are volcanoes, and the mountains of the neighboring Lease Islands are extinct volcanoes. Granite and serpentine rocks predominate, but the shores of Amboina Bay are of chalk and contain stalactite caves.

Wild areas of Ambon Island are covered by tropical rainforest, part of the Seram rain forests ecoregion, together with neighboring Seram. Seram, Ambon, and most of Maluku are part of Wallacea, the group of Indonesian islands that are separated by deep water from both the Asian and Australian continents and have never been linked to the continents by land.

As a result of this isolation, Ambon has few indigenous mammals; birds are more abundant. The insect diversity of the island, however, is rich, particularly in butterflies. Seashells are obtained in great numbers and variety. Tortoise shell is also exported.

The population of the island (administered as Kota Ambon, Kecamatan Leihitu, Kecamatan Leihitu Barat, and Kecamatan Salahutu), including a tiny sparsely populated island to the north, was just below 441,000 in the 2010 Census, but by 2020 had risen to over 475,000.

Climate
Rainfall can be heavy, especially after the eastern monsoons, and the island is vulnerable to violent typhoons. The wet season (October to April) coincides with the period of the west monsoon.

Economy

Cassava and sago are the chief crops, which also include breadfruit, sugarcane, coffee, cocoa, pepper and cotton. In addition to these, hunting and fishing supplement the local diet. Nutmeg and cloves were once the dominant export crops but are now produced in limited quantities. Copra is also exported. Amboina wood, obtained from the angsana tree and highly valued for ornamental woodwork, is now mostly grown on Seram. The main employers in Ambon Island are the Gubernatorial Office (PEMDA), the Mayoral Office (PEMKOT), Raiders 733 (Indonesian military unit).

The whole economy of Ambon Island is starting to shift out of the "Old Towne" ("Kota Lama") toward Passo, which is the newly appointed central business district of the island region. The economy of Ambon Island was recently boosted by the investment made by Ciputra Group in creating a whole new satellite city in Lateri, Kotamadya Ambon, Maluku: Citraland Bay View City. The new international standard shopping center, Ambon City Center, opened in 2012.

Demographics

The Ambonese are of mixed Malay-Papuan origin. They are mostly Christians or Muslims. The predominant language of the island is Ambonese Malay, also called Ambonese. It developed as the trade language of central Maluku and is spoken elsewhere in Maluku as a second language. The old creole trade language called Portugis has died out. Bilingualism in Indonesian is high around Ambon City. There have been strong religious tensions on the island between Muslims and Christians and ethnic tensions between indigenous Ambonese and migrants from Sulawesi, primarily Butonese, Bugis and Makassarese migrants.

History

Colonial era

In 1512, the Portuguese were the first Europeans to land in Ambon, and it became the new centre for Portuguese activities in Maluku following their expulsion from Ternate. The Portuguese, however, were regularly attacked by native Muslims on the island's northern coast, in particular Hitu, which had trading and religious links with major port cities on Java's north coast. They established a factory in 1521 but did not obtain peaceable possession of it until 1580. Indeed, the Portuguese never managed to control the local trade in spices and failed in attempts to establish their authority over the Banda Islands, the nearby centre of nutmeg production. The creole trade language Portugis, however, was spoken well into the 19th century, and many families still have Portuguese names and claim Portuguese ancestry, for example Muskita and De Fretes.

The Dutch dispossessed the Portuguese in 1605, when Steven van der Hagen took over the fort without a single shot. Ambon was the headquarters of the Dutch East India Company (VOC) from 1610 to 1619 until the founding of Batavia (now Jakarta) by the Dutch. About 1615 the English formed a settlement on the island at Cambello, which they retained until 1623, when the Dutch destroyed it. Frightful tortures inflicted on its unfortunate inhabitants were connected with its destruction. In 1654, after many fruitless negotiations, Oliver Cromwell compelled the United Provinces to give the sum of 300,000 gulden, as compensation to the descendants of those who suffered in the "Ambon Massacre", together with Manhattan. In 1673, the poet John Dryden produced his tragedy Amboyna; or the Cruelties of the Dutch to the English Merchants. The British, under Admiral Peter Rainier, captured Ambon in 1796, but they restored it to the Dutch at the Peace of Amiens in 1802. They retook the island in 1810 but once more restored it to the Dutch in 1814. Ambon used to be the world center of clove production; until the nineteenth century, the Dutch prohibited the rearing of the clove tree on all the other islands subject to their rule, in order to secure the monopoly to Ambon.

Under the Dutch Empire, Ambon city was the seat of the Dutch resident and military commander of the Moluccas. The town was protected by Fort Victoria, and a 1902 Encyclopædia characterized it as "a clean little town with wide streets, well planted". The population was divided into two classes: orang burger or citizens and orang negri or villagers, the former being a class of native origin enjoying certain privileges conferred on their ancestors by the old Dutch East India Company. There were also, besides the Dutch, some Arabs, Chinese and a few Portuguese settlers.

Ambon city was the site of a major Dutch military base that Imperial Japanese forces captured from Allied forces in the World War II Battle of Ambon in 1942. The battle was followed by the summary execution of more than 300 Allied prisoners of war in the Laha massacre.

A large Far East prisoner of war camp was situated in the north near Liang. This was made up of British men of the 77th HAA, 3rd Kings Own Hussars and some RAF volunteers. Approximately 1,000 men arrived in April 1943 and were marched from Ambon town over two days without food or water (see 1000 men of Liang to follow).

The FEPOWs built the camp including a water pipeline. They were ordered to build an airfield and runway alongside the beach and cleared coconut trees for the task. They did all they could to sabotage construction.

Conditions were horrendous and many men died due to disease, starvation and ill treatment by the Japanese. Many men also suffered blindness due to working chipping at the coral.

Conflicts since independence
Indonesia won its independence in 1945–49. As a consequence of ethnic and religious tensions, and President Sukarno making Indonesia a unitary state, Ambon was the scene of a revolt against the Indonesian government, resulting in the rebellion of the Republic of South Maluku in 1950.

In April and May 1958 during the Permesta rebellion in North Sulawesi, the USA supported and supplied the rebels. Pilots from a Taiwan-based CIA front organisation, Civil Air Transport, flying CIA B-26 Invader aircraft, repeatedly bombed and machine-gunned targets on Ambon. From 27 April until 18 May there were CIA air raids on Ambon city. Also, on 8 May 1958 CIA pilot Allen Pope bombed and machine-gunned the Indonesian Air Force base at Liang in the northeast of the island, damaging the runway and destroying a Consolidated PBY Catalina. The Indonesian Air Force had only one serviceable fighter aircraft on Ambon Island, a North American P-51 Mustang at Liang. Pope's last air raid was on 18 May, when an Indonesian pilot at Liang, Captain Ignatius Dewanto, was scrambled to the P-51. Pope had attacked Ambon city before Dewanto could catch him, but Dewanto intercepted him just as Pope was attacking one of a pair of troop ships in an Indonesian fleet west of Ambon Island. The B-26 was brought down by fire from both Dewanto and shipborne anti-aircraft gunners. Pope and his Indonesian radio operator bailed out and were captured, which immediately exposed the level of CIA support for the Permesta rebellion. Embarrassed, the Eisenhower administration quickly ended CIA support for Permesta and withdrew its agents and remaining aircraft from the conflict.

Between 1999 and 2002, Ambon was at the centre of sectarian conflict across the Maluku Islands. In 2007, Ambon resident Leonard Joni Sinay was sentenced to fifteen years' imprisonment for treason after he and other activists protested a visit by President Susilo Bambang Yudhoyono with a dance and a raising of the banned regional flag; both Human Rights Watch and Amnesty International called for his release, the latter organization designating him a prisoner of conscience.

See also

E. U. Pupella
Sikula River

References

Sources

Further reading

External links

Ambon Banda Island Tourism

Former Portuguese colonies
Banda Sea
Maluku Islands
Portuguese colonialism in Indonesia
Outer Banda Arc